Västanfors Church (Swedish: Västanfors kyrka) is located at Västanfors in Fagersta Municipality, Västmanland County, Sweden.

History
Before the church was built, here was a wood church, built in 1642.
Drawings for a new church were established in 1818 by architect Lorens Axel Fredrik Almfelt (1781-1844).
The present church building was built 1824–27 and opened in 1830. The last renovation of the church was in 1987–88, according to drawing by architect Jerk Alton.

References

External links
Västanfors kyrka website

Churches completed in 1830
Churches in Västmanland County
19th-century Church of Sweden church buildings
1830 establishments in Sweden
Churches in the Diocese of Västerås